Mar Shemon V (died September 1502) was the patriarch of the Church of the East from 1497 until his death. His short reign is poorly documented and it is possible that he was in fact an anti-patriarch.

Probably in 1499, Shemʿon V received a pair of messengers from the Indian church requesting bishops. The patriarch consecrated Thomas and John, two monks of the monastery of Mar Awgin, as bishops and dispatched them to India with letters of authentication. Thomas returned not long after with gifts from the Indian Christians, while John remained there as bishop.

Shemʿon's death is recorded in a letter from the Indian Christians. He was buried in the monastery of Mar Awgin. It may be significant that he was not buried in the monastery of Rabban Hormizd, where his predecessor, Shemʿon IV, and nearly all his successors were buried. is election may have represented a reaction to the policies of Shemʿon IV favouring his own family.

Notes

Bibliography

1502 deaths
15th-century bishops of the Church of the East
Patriarchs of the Church of the East
16th-century bishops of the Church of the East